Grace Kim may refer to:

Grace Kim (tennis) (born 1968), American professional tennis player
Grace Kim (model) (born 1979), American model
Grace Kim (golfer) (born 2000), Australian professional golfer